Villaverde may refer to:

Places

Italy
Villa Verde, Sardinia

Philippines
Villaverde, Nueva Vizcaya

Spain
Andalusia
Villaverde del Río

Asturias
Villaverde (Allande)

Basque Country
Villaverde, Álava

Cantabria
Valle de Villaverde, formerly Villaverde de Trucíos

Castile and León
Villaverde de Guareña
Villaverde de Íscar
Villaverde de Medina
Villaverde de Montejo
Villaverde del Monte
Villaverde-Mogina

Castilla-La Mancha
Villaverde de Guadalimar
Villaverde y Pasaconsol

La Rioja
Villaverde de Rioja

Community of Madrid
Villaverde, Madrid

United States
Villa Verde (Pasadena, California), listed on the U.S. National Register of Historic Places

People
Hugo Villaverde (born 1954), Argentine footballer
Teresa Villaverde (born 1966), Portuguese film director